Baduy (or sometimes spelled as Badui) is one of the Sundanese-Baduy languages spoken predominantly by the Baduy people. Native speakers of the Baduy language are spread in regions around the Mount Kendeng, Rangkasbitung district of Lebak Regency, Pandeglang Regency and Sukabumi, West Java, Indonesia. It is estimated that there are 11,620 speakers as of 2010.

References

Sundanese language
Languages of Indonesia